Hot Country Songs is a chart that ranks the top-performing country music songs in the United States, published by Billboard magazine.  In 2004, 21 different songs topped the chart, then published under the title Hot Country Singles & Tracks, in 52 issues of the magazine, based on weekly airplay data from country music radio stations compiled by Nielsen SoundScan.

Singer Kenny Chesney's song "There Goes My Life" was at number one at the start of the year, having been at the top since the issue of Billboard dated December 20, 2003.  It remained at number one for the first five weeks of 2004 before being replaced by "Remember When" by Alan Jackson.  The highest total number of weeks spent at number one by a song in 2004 was seven, achieved by "Live Like You Were Dying" by Tim McGraw, which was ranked number one on Billboard'''s year-end chart of the most popular country songs.  As the song's seven weeks at the top were split into two separate spells, however, the longest unbroken run at the top was five weeks, achieved by three different songs, two of which were by Chesney: "There Goes My Life" and "When the Sun Goes Down", the latter a collaboration with Uncle Kracker.  The third song with a five-week run at the top was "Redneck Woman" by Gretchen Wilson.

Tim McGraw achieved the most number one hits of the year, with three, and tied with Kenny Chesney for the most weeks in the top spot, with ten.  Chesney and Toby Keith were the only artists other than McGraw to place more than one song at number one in 2004, with two each.  When his collaboration with Chesney reached the top spot, Uncle Kracker gained a number one with his first single to appear on the country chart.  While Kracker had previously released other recordings and even appeared on other Billboard'' charts, Gretchen Wilson achieved the feat of topping the chart with her very first single when "Redneck Woman" reached the top spot in May.  It marked the first chart-topper by a solo female artist for more than two years, but was followed to the top later in the year by songs by Reba McEntire, Terri Clark and Sara Evans.  The only other act to achieve a first number one in 2004 was the duo Montgomery Gentry.  The final number one of the year was "Some Beach" by Blake Shelton.

Chart history

See also
2004 in music
List of artists who reached number one on the U.S. country chart

References

2004
United States Country Singles
2004 in American music